Ekrixinatosaurus ('explosion-born reptile') is a genus of abelisaurid theropod which lived approximately 100 to 97 million years ago during the Late Cretaceous period. Its fossils have been found in Argentina. Only one species is currently recognized, Ekrixinatosaurus novasi, from which the specific name honors of Dr. Fernando Novas for his contributions to the study of abelisaurid theropods.

Discovery and naming 
The type species, Ekrixinatosaurus novasi, was first described in 2004 by Argentinian paleontologist Jorge Calvo, and Chilean paleontologists David Rubilar-Rogers and Karen Moreno. The fossils were found dispersed over an area of 15m in the Candeleros Formation, a geologic formation that outcrops in Río Negro, Neuquén, and Mendoza provinces of Argentina. This formation dates from 100-97 mya., and consists of red beds where other famous vertebrate animals have been discovered, such as Giganotosaurus, Rebbachisaurus, and Andesaurus. The discovery occurred due to excavations for building a gas pipeline conducted by Gasoducto del Pacífico Company in Bajo del Añelo.

Before the discovery of Ekrixinatosaurus, Carnotaurus sastrei and Aucasaurus garridoi were the most complete specimens of the abelisauridae family. The remains of Ekrixinatosaurus helped fill in more information about abelisaur anatomy as it contained portions of the skeleton that were previously unknown, unpublished, or poorly preserved in other specimens. The holotype skeleton (MUCPv-294) was well preserved yet disarticulated. It contained elements including a left and partial right maxillae; basicranium; both dentaries; teeth; cervical, a dorsal, sacral and caudal vertebrae; haemal arches; ribs; ilia, pubis and proximal ischia; left and distal end of right femur; left tibia; left astragalus and calcaneum; proximal end of left fibula and right tibia; metatarsals; phalanges; and a pedal ungual.

Description 

Ekrixinatosaurus novasi is a large abelisaurid with a relatively large head and robust limbs. The combination of characteristics including a large skull, prominent supraorbital ridge above the dorsal aspect of the orbit, anteroposteriorly compressed cervical vertebrae, and robust, proportionally short hindlimbs with a tibia shorter than femur suggests that this was a massive animal with a great capacity to sustain injuries during intraspecific or interspecific combat.

Skull 

The skull of Ekrixinatosaurus was boxy and proportionally shorter and deeper than most other large carnivorous dinosaurs. The jaws also curved upward, a trait shared with some other abelisaurs. The skull is estimated to be approximately 83 cm long based on comparisons with Carnotaurus and Majungasaurus, and while Abelisaurus does not have a complete maxilla its preserved size is similar to that of Ekrixinatosaurus. As in other abelisaurids, the facial bones, especially the nasal bones, were sculptured with numerous small holes and spikes. In life, a wrinkled and possibly keratinous skin would have covered these bones. The maxilla was short and contained 16 alveoli, some with short teeth that were flattened laterally with anterior and posterior serrations. The maxilla of Ekrixinatosaurus also exhibits a dorsally projected ascending ramus and a short rostral ramus, suggesting a relatively high skull.

Classification 

In 2004, Ekrixinatosaurus was placed in the Abelisauridae. The article by Calvo et al. in 2004, also contained a preliminary cladistic analysis of the phylogenetic relationships between Ekrixinatosaurus and those abelisaurids of which at the time relatively complete skeletons were known, finding it to be more closely related to Carnotaurini than to Ceratosaurus.

In 2008, a study recovered it as the sister species of Skorpiovenator.

Paleoecology 
Ekrixinatosaurus was found in the red beds of the Candeleros Formation, which has yielded a wide variety of vertebrates. It shared its environment with the titanosaurian sauropod Andesaurus and the rebbachisaurid sauropods Limaysaurus and Nopcsaspondylus. Iguanodont ornithischian remains have reportedly also been found. The carcharodontosaurid Giganotosaurus was possibly the apex predator. Smaller predators also inhabited the area, including the dromaeosaurid Buitreraptor, the alvarezsauroid Alnashetri, and the basal coelurosaurian Bicentenaria. Other primitive reptiles lived in the area, such as the primitive snake Najash, the crocodile Araripesuchus, along with turtles, fish, pipid frogs, and mammals. Pterosaurs also lived in the area, as evidenced by pterosaur tracks. A wide variety of dinosaur trackways have also been found in the Candeleros Formation, suggesting significant activity in the area.

Recent studies on Gondwanan theropods have interpreted abelisauroids as modest and medium-sized dinosaurs that co-occurred with giant carcharodontosaurids during the Early and early Late Cretaceous. It has been hypothesized that it was only after extinction of these carcharodontosaurids that abelisaurids were able to diversify into more robust forms that occupied the niche of top predators of their ecosystems. However, it has been observed that both Giganotosaurus and Ekrixinatosaurus were among the largest of their respective clades yet existed at the same time, which refutes this hypothesis. Both these animals occupied the role of the largest carnivores, however it is uncertain whether they played different ecological roles (such as active predation vs. scavenging). In addition, the known distribution of abelisaurids in South America, Madagascar and India brings the hypothesis of a dispersion route between these areas by a terrestrial bridge called the Kerguelen Plateau that formed prior to the separation of Africa and South America.

See also 
 Timeline of ceratosaur research

References 

Brachyrostrans
Cenomanian life
Late Cretaceous dinosaurs of South America
Cretaceous Argentina
Fossils of Argentina
Candeleros Formation
Fossil taxa described in 2004